County Dublin refers to a subdivision of Ireland occasioned by the Norman invasion of Ireland. This shire or county underwent further subdivisions as the territory was subinfeudated by the great barons among their vassals; these smaller areas were known as baronies. Under the government of the Kingdom of Ireland, baronies were in turn split into civil parishes. These also were split into the lowest recognised legal unit of land - the townland.

In 1994, County Dublin was abolished as a local government area, to be replaced by Dún Laoghaire–Rathdown, Fingal and South Dublin. In 2001, the county borough of Dublin, was renamed Dublin City, with the Dublin Corporation replaced by Dublin City Council.

Legal status
The Dublin Region is a NUTS III statistical region in Ireland, as recognised by the European Union. It is one of eight regions of the Republic of Ireland. The region encompasses those areas previously defined by the county of Dublin, being the local government areas of:
 Dublin City
 Dún Laoghaire–Rathdown
 Fingal
 South Dublin.

For the elections to the Dáil, the boundaries of the constituencies must respect the overall boundaries of the Dublin.

Usage
While no organ of the state continues to officially recognise the former county of Dublin, there are certain exceptions. During the COVID-19 pandemic in the Republic of Ireland, both the Department of Health and the Department of the Taoiseach referred to "County Dublin" when reporting county-by-county incidences and when announcing local lockdowns, rather than using the term "Dublin Region" or its four local government areas. Further, the Dublin Chamber of Commerce refers to Dublin as both a county and a region interchangeably.

The term "County Dublin" is a recognised placename for all four local government areas collectively. The term still in common use and residents in all four local government areas share a collective Dublin identity. Dublin is still organised as a county by the Gaelic Athletic Association in the case of Dublin GAA.

Division by barony and civil parish

Most of the links are to articles on modern districts, which are usually not fully aligned to the civil parishes.

Electoral divisions

City of Dublin

North
 Arran Quay A,
 Arran Quay B,
 Arran Quay C,
 Arran Quay D,
 Arran Quay E,
 Ashtown A,
 Ashtown B,
 Ayrfield,
 Ballybough A,
 Ballybough B,
 Ballygall A,
 Ballygall B,
 Ballygall C,
 Ballygall D,
 Ballymun A,
 Ballymun B,
 Ballymun C,
 Ballymun D,
 Ballymun E,
 Ballymun F,
 Beaumont A,
 Beaumont B,
 Beaumont C,
 Beaumont D,
 Beaumont E,
 Beaumont F,
 Botanic A,
 Botanic B,
 Botanic C,
 Cabra East A,
 Cabra East B,
 Cabra East C,
 Cabra West A,
 Cabra West B,
 Cabra West C,
 Cabra West D,
 Clontarf East A,
 Clontarf East B,
 Clontarf East C,
 Clontarf East D,
 Clontarf East E,
 Clontarf West A,
 Clontarf West B,
 Clontarf West C,
 Clontarf West D,
 Clontarf West E,
 Drumcondra South A,
 Drumcondra South B,
 Drumcondra South C,
 Edenmore,
 Finglas North A,
 Finglas North B,
 Finglas North C,
 Finglas South A,
 Finglas South B,
 Finglas South C,
 Finglas South D,
 Grace Park,
 Grange A,
 Grange B,
 Grange C,
 Grange D,
 Grange E,
 Harmonstown A,
 Harmonstown B,
 Inns Quay A,
 Inns Quay B,
 Inns Quay C,
 Kilmore A,
 Kilmore B,
 Kilmore C,
 Kilmore D,
 Mountjoy A,
 Mountjoy B,
 North City,
 North Dock A,
 North Dock B,
 North Dock C,
 Phoenix Park,
 Priorswood A,
 Priorswood B,
 Priorswood C,
 Priorswood D,
 Priorswood E,
 Raheny-Foxfield,
 Raheny-Greendale,
 Raheny-St. Assam,
 Rotunda A,
 Rotunda B,
 Whitehall A,
 Whitehall B,
 Whitehall C,
 Whitehall D,

South
 Chapelizod,
 Cherry Orchard A,
 Carna,
 Cherry Orchard C,
 Crumlin A,
 Crumlin B,
 Crumlin C,
 Crumlin D,
 Crumlin E,
 Crumlin F,
 Decies,
 Drumfinn,
 Inchicore A,
 Inchicore B,
 Kilmainham A,
 Kilmainham B,
 Kilmainham C,
 Kimmage A,
 Kimmage B,
 Kimmage C,
 Kimmage D,
 Kimmage E,
 Kylemore,
 Mansion House A,
 Mansion House B,
 Merchants Quay A,
 Merchants Quay B,
 Merchants Quay C,
 Merchants Quay D,
 Merchants Quay E,
 Merchants Quay F,
 Pembroke East A,
 Pembroke East B,
 Pembroke East C,
 Pembroke East D,
 Pembroke East E,
 Pembroke West A,
 Pembroke West B,
 Pembroke West C,
 Rathfarnham,
 Rathmines East A,
 Rathmines East B,
 Rathmines East C,
 Rathmines East D,
 Rathmines West A,
 Rathmines West B,
 Rathmines West C,
 Rathmines West D,
 Rathmines West E,
 Rathmines West F,
 Royal Exchange A,
 Royal Exchange B,
 St. Kevin’s,
 South Dock,
 Terenure A,
 Terenure B,
 Terenure C,
 Terenure D,
 Ushers A,
 Ushers B,
 Ushers C,
 Ushers D,
 Ushers E,
 Ushers F,
 Walkinstown A,
 Walkinstown B,
 Walkinstown C,
 Wood Quay A,
 Wood Quay B

Dún Laoghaire–Rathdown
 Ballinteer-Broadford,
 Ballinteer-Ludford,
 Ballinteer-Marley,
 Ballinteer-Meadowbroads,
 Ballinteer-Meadowmount,
 Ballinteer-Woodpark,
 Ballybrack,
 Blackrock-Booterstown,
 Blackrock-Carysfort,
 Blackrock-Central,
 Blackrock-Glenomena,
 Blackrock-Monkstown,
 Blackrock-Newpark,
 Blackrock-Seapoint,
 Blackrock-Stradbrook,
 Blackrock-Templehill,
 Blackrock-Williamstown,
 Cabinteely-Granitefield,
 Cabinteely-Kilbogget,
 Cabinteely-Loughlinstown,
 Cabinteely-Pottery,
 Churchtown-Castle,
 Churchtown-Landscape,
 Churchtown-Nutgrove,
 Churchtown-Orwell,
 Churchtown-Woodlawn,
 Clonskeagh-Belfield,
 Clonskeagh-Farranboley,
 Clonskeagh-Milltown,
 Clonskeagh-Roebuck,
 Clonskeagh-Windy Arbour,
 Dalkey-Avondale,
 Dalkey-Bullock,
 Dalkey-Coliemore,
 Dalkey Hill,
 Dalkey Upper,
 Dundrum-Balally,
 Dundrum-Kilmacud,
 Dundrum-Sandyford,
 Dundrum-Sweetmount,
 Dundrum-Taney,
 Dún Laoghaire-East Central,
 Dún Laoghaire-Glasthule,
 Dún Laoghaire-Glenageary,
 Dún Laoghaire-Monkstown Farm,
 Dún Laoghaire-Mount Town,
 Dún Laoghaire-Sallynoggin East,
 Dún Laoghaire-Sallynoggin South,
 Dún Laoghaire-Sallynoggin West,
 Dún Laoghaire-Sandycove,
 Dún Laoghaire-Salthill,
 Dún Laoghaire-West Central,
 Foxrock-Beechpark,
 Foxrock-Carrickmines,
 Foxrock-Deans Grange,
 Foxrock-Torquay,
 Glencullen,
 Johnstown,
 Killiney North,
 Killiney South,
 Shankill-Rathmichael,
 Shankill-Rathsallagh,
 Shankill-Shanganagh,
 Stillorgan-Deerpark,
 Stillorgan-Kilmacud,
 Stillorgan-Leopardstown,
 Stillorgan-Merville,
 Stillorgan-Mount Merrion,
 Stillorgan-Priory,
 Tibradden

Fingal
 Airport,
 Balbriggan Rural,
 Balbriggan Urban,
 Baldoyle,
 Balgriffin,
 Ballyboghil,
 Balscadden,
 Blanchardstown-Abbotstown,
 Blanchardstown-Blakestown,
 Blanchardstown-Coolmine,
 Blanchardstown-Corduff,
 Blanchardstown-Delwood,
 Blanchardstown-Mulhuddart,
 Blanchardstown-Roselawn,
 Blanchardstown-Tyrrelstown,
 Castleknock-Knockmaroon,
 Castleknock-Park,
 Clonmethan,
 Donabate,
 Dubber,
 Garristown,
 Hollywood,
 Holmpatrick,
 Howth,
 Kilsallaghan,
 Kinsaley,
 Lucan North,
 Lusk,
 Malahide East,
 Malahide West,
 Portmarnock North,
 Portmarnock South,
 Rush,
 Skerries,
 Sutton,
 Swords-Forrest,
 Swords-Glasmore,
 Swords-Lissenhall,
 Swords-Seatown,
 Swords Village,
 The Ward,
 Turnapin

South Dublin
 Ballinascorney,
 Ballyboden,
 Bohernabreena,
 Clondalkin-Ballymount,
 Clondalkin-Cappaghmore,
 Clondalkin-Dunawley,
 Clondalkin-Monastery,
 Clondalkin-Moorfield,
 Clondalkin-Rowlagh,
 Clondalkin Village,
 Edmondstown,
 Firhouse-Ballycullen,
 Firhouse-Knocklyon,
 Firhouse Village,
 Lucan-Esker,
 Lucan Heights,
 Lucan-St. Helen’s,
 Newcastle,
 Palmerston Village,
 Palmerston West,
 Rathcoole,
 Rathfarnham-Ballyroan,
 Rathfarnham-Butterfield,
 Rathfarnham-Hermitage,
 Rathfarnham-St. Enda’s,
 Rathfarnham Village,
 Saggart,
 Tallaght-Avonbeg,
 Tallaght-Belgard,
 Tallaght-Fettercairn,
 Tallaght-Glenview,
 Tallaght-Jobstown,
 Tallaght-Killinardan,
 Tallaght-Kilnamanagh,
 Tallaght-Kiltipper,
 Tallaght-Kingswood,
 Tallaght-Millbrook,
 Tallaght-Oldbawn,
 Tallaght-Springfield,
 Tallaght-Tymon,
 Templeogue-Cypress,
 Templeogue-Kimmage Manor,
 Templeogue-Limekiln,
 Templeogue-Orwell,
 Templeogue-Osprey,
 Templeogue Village,
 Terenure-Cherryfield,
 Terenure-Greentrees,
 Terenure-St. James

References

County Dublin, subdivisions
Sub-divisions of County Dublin
Subdivisions
Civil parishes of County Dublin